Two referendums were held together in Ireland on 7 December 1972, each on a proposed amendment of the Irish constitution. Both proposals were approved by voters.

Fourth amendment

The Fourth Amendment to the constitution lowered the voting age for all national elections and referendums in the state from twenty-one to eighteen years of age

Fifth amendment

The Fifth Amendment to the constitution removed reference to "special position" of the Roman Catholic Church and to certain other named denominations.

See also
Constitutional amendment
Politics of the Republic of Ireland
History of the Republic of Ireland

References

Constitutional referendums
Irish constitutional referendums
Irish constitutional referendums
Ireland 1972
Suffrage referendums
Irish constitutional referendums
Constitutional referendums, December 1972